Iran participated in the 1958 Asian Games held in the capital city of Tokyo, Japan. This country is ranked 4th with 7 gold medals in this edition of the Asiad.

Competitors

Medal summary

Medal table

Medalists

Results by event

Aquatics

Diving

Swimming

Athletics

Boxing

This was the first time Iranian boxers were participating in an official Asian tournament, such as the Asian Games, with 9 boxers, the most boxers after the Japanese boxing team. In the 1958 Asian Games in Tokyo, the Iranian boxing team managed to bag a total of 6 medals, including three silver medals, three bronze medals, and also obtained three fifth places. The consequence of this participation resulted in Iran's boxing team to rank second, considering medal counts, and fifth, in the overall boxing table, helping Iran Sports Convoy to rank fourth, overall in the Third Asian Games, which was applauded by the Iranian officials.

The Iranian national boxing team, which consisted of boxers from Tehran Taj club and Tehran Jafari club, was coached by Petros Nazarbegian, and the team members were: Ezaria Ilkhanoff (Persian: ایزاریا ایلخانوف) in the Flyweight division (bronze medal), Karapet Kochar (Persian: کاراپت کوچار) in the Bantamweight division (fifth place), Sadegh Aliakbarzadeh (Persian: صادق علی اکبرزاده) in the Featherweight division (fifth place), Hassan Pakandam (Persian: حسن پاک اندام) in the Lightweight division (fifth place), Vazik Kazarian (Persian: وازیک قازاریان) in the Light-Welterweight division (silver medal), Soren Pirjanian (Persian: سورن پیرجانیان) in the Welterweight division (silver medal), Amir Yavari (captain) (Persian: امیر یاوری) in the Light-middleweight division (silver medal), Leon Khachatourian (Persian: لئون خاچاطوریان) in the Middleweight division (bronze medal), Akbar Khojini (Persian: اکبرخوجینی) in the Light heavyweight division (bronze medal), (no participant in the Heavyweight division).

Men

Cycling

Football

Shooting

Table tennis

Tennis

Men

Volleyball

Weightlifting

Men

Wrestling

Men's freestyle

References

  Iran Olympic Committee - Asian Games Medalists
  Iran National Sports Organization - Asian Games Medalists

Nations at the 1958 Asian Games
1958
Asian Games